The North Fork of the Yachats Bridge is a covered bridge in Lincoln County in the U.S. state of Oregon. The structure was added to the National Register of Historic Places in 1979.

Otis Hamer, a veteran constructor of bridges, built the queen post truss structure for Lincoln County in 1938. It was the last of his covered bridges.

It is one of only two covered bridges in Lincoln County that are open to vehicular traffic; the other is the Chitwood Bridge. The weight limit on the bridge is ten tons; large trucks and recreational vehicles (RV)s are not allowed.

After an accident damaged the bridge in 1987, county crews repaired it. They returned in 1989 for a more complete renovation, including new trusses, approaches, a new roof and new siding.

See also
 List of bridges on the National Register of Historic Places in Oregon
 List of Oregon covered bridges

References

Bridges completed in 1938
Bridges in Lincoln County, Oregon
Covered bridges on the National Register of Historic Places in Oregon
Wooden bridges in Oregon
Tourist attractions in Lincoln County, Oregon
National Register of Historic Places in Lincoln County, Oregon
Road bridges on the National Register of Historic Places in Oregon
Queen post truss bridges in the United States